The Central District of Dalahu County is a district (bakhsh) in Dalahu County, Kermanshah Province, Iran. At the 2006 census, its population was 21,734, in 5,065 families.  The District has two cities: Kerend-e Gharb & Shahrak-e Rijab. The District has three rural districts (dehestan): Ban Zardeh Rural District, Bivanij Rural District, and Howmeh-ye Kerend Rural District.

References 

Dalahu County
Districts of Kermanshah Province